Pandoflabella is a genus of snout moths. It was erected by Maria Alma Solis in 1993.

Species
 Pandoflabella brendana
 Pandoflabella corumbina
 Pandoflabella fechina
 Pandoflabella guianica
 Pandoflabella nigrilunalis
 Pandoflabella nigriplaga (Dognin, 1910)
 Pandoflabella olivescens
 Pandoflabella remberta
 Pandoflabella stenipteralis
 Pandoflabella strigidiscalis
 Pandoflabella tresaina

References

Epipaschiinae
Pyralidae genera